Andrew A. Philipsen (1939 – September 13, 1985) was a Canadian politician, who served in the Legislative Assembly of Yukon from 1982 to 1985. He represented the electoral district of Whitehorse Porter Creek West as a member of the Yukon Progressive Conservative Party.

Born in Oxfordshire, England in 1939, Philipsen moved to Canada with his family in 1940. In adulthood he trained as an electrician, and moved to Yukon in 1962, where he worked for various electrical contractors and transportation companies.

He was first elected to the legislature in the 1982 territorial election. He served in the Executive Council of Yukon as Minister of Health and Human Resources and Government Services, Minister of Justice and Minister of Community and Transportation Services.

He was reelected to the legislature in the 1985 election on May 13, 1985, but died in a vehicle accident on the Dempster Highway on September 13. He was succeeded in a by-election in February 1986 by Alan Nordling.

References

1939 births
1985 deaths
Politicians from Whitehorse
Yukon Party MLAs
People from Oxfordshire
English emigrants to Canada
Road incident deaths in Canada